The Drežnik Viaduct is located in Karlovac, Croatia, immediately to the south of the Karlovac interchange on the A1 motorway. It is the longest viaduct in Croatia, spanning . It is executed in seven segments (++4x+ long), separated by expansion joints. The viaduct was constructed by Konstruktor, Split, as the main contractor, and Viadukt and Hidroelektra of Zagreb as subcontractors in 2000 and 2001.

There are no sidewalks and no emergency lanes on the bridge itself. The superstructure is executed in I-section prefabricated reinforced concrete girders, made monolithic with in situ executed transverse beams and the deck slab. Foundations of the viaduct are executed on piles.

Cost of the construction works related to the Drežnik Viaduct was 250 million Croatian kuna.

The Drežnik Viaduct is the largest and the most significant structure on the Karlovac - Bosiljevo 1 section of the A1 motorway, which carries the transit traffic between Zagreb in the north and Rijeka and Split in the south, and channels it away from the Karlovac city centre, dramatically reducing travel times between those cities and relieving traffic congestion from the D1 state road running through Karlovac, which was especially severe during summer seasons.

Traffic volume
Traffic is regularly counted and reported by Hrvatske autoceste, operator of the viaduct and the A1 motorway where the structure is located, and published by Hrvatske ceste. Substantial variations between annual (AADT) and summer (ASDT) traffic volumes are attributed to the fact that the bridge carries substantial tourist traffic to the Adriatic resorts. The traffic count is performed using analysis of motorway toll ticket sales.

See also
List of arch bridges by length
List of bridges by length

References

External links
Autocesta Rijeka–Zagreb: Drežnik Viaduct webcam

Viaducts in Croatia
Beam bridges
Bridges completed in 2001
Toll bridges in Croatia
Buildings and structures in Karlovac County
Transport in Karlovac County